John Calvin Powers (July 8, 1929 – September 25, 2001) was an American professional baseball player, an outfielder who played for all or parts of six seasons in Major League Baseball for the Pittsburgh Pirates, Cincinnati Reds, Baltimore Orioles and Cleveland Indians.

Although he hit only .195 in 151 MLB games played and 215 at bats, Powers was a feared batsman in minor league baseball, smashing 39 home runs in 1950 for the Class B Waco Pirates and in 1956 for the Double-A New Orleans Pelicans. He belted 298 home runs in his minor league career (1949–1951; 1954–1957; 1960–1965).

He died at age 72 in Birmingham.

External links

1929 births
2001 deaths
Baltimore Orioles players
Baseball players from Birmingham, Alabama
Buffalo Bisons (minor league) players
Charleston Rebels players
Cincinnati Reds players
Cleveland Indians players
Columbus Jets players
Gadsden Chiefs players
Hollywood Stars players
Major League Baseball outfielders
New Orleans Pelicans (baseball) players
Pittsburgh Pirates players
Tacoma Giants players
Valley Rebels players
Waco Pirates players
Williamsport Grays players